Tvoje lice zvuči poznato is the Croatian version of Your Face Sounds Familiar. The third season started on September 25, 2016. There are four judges in season three, Goran Navojec (actor), Sandra Bagarić (opera singer), Tomo in der Mühlen (music producer & DJ) and different guest judges in every episode.

Format
The show challenges celebrities (singers and actors) to perform as different iconic music artists every week, which are chosen by the show's "Randomiser". They are then judged by the panel of celebrity judges including Goran Navojec, Sandra Bagarić and Tomo in der Mühlen. Every week, one celebrity guest judge joins Goran, Sandra and Tomo to make up the complete judging panel. Each celebrity gets transformed into a different singer every week, and performs an iconic song and dance routine well known by that particular singer. The Randomiser can choose any older or younger artist available in the machine, even a singer of the opposite sex, or a deceased singer. In third season (Week 3), ability to use a joker was introduced. If celebrity wasn't happy with the Randomiser's output or thought that the task is too hard, they could ask some other celebrity to perform instead of them, but just once per season. The winner of every episode gets to donate 10 000 HRK, while the overall leader gets to donate 40 000 HRK at the end of the season. The show lasts for 13 weeks.

Voting
The contestants are awarded points from the judges (and each other) based on their singing and dance routines. Judges award from 4 to 12 - excluding 11 - points to each contestant. After that, each contestant gives 5 points to a fellow contestant of their choice (known as "Bonus" points). In week 12 (semi-final week), four contestants with the highest number of votes will qualify to the final. In week 13 (grand final), previous points will be transformed into a 4-7 system, the jury will award from 8 to 12 points, and contestants will give 5 points to a fellow contestant of their choice.

Judges
Goran Navojec - Croatian actor, known for many roles on television series and in feature films.
Sandra Bagarić - Bosnian opera singer also active in Croatia
Tomo in der Mühlen - German-born music producer and DJ based in New York City and Zagreb.

Guest member

Saša Lozar (Week 1)
Ecija Ojdanić (Week 2)
Maja Šuput (Week 3)
Indira Levak (Week 4)
Ivan Šarić (Week 5)
Danijela Martinović (Week 6)
Andrea Andrassy (Week 7)
Nives Ivanković (Week 8)
Ivana Marić (Week 9)
Alka Vuica (Week 10)
Ivan Zak (Week 11)
Mario Petreković (Week 12)
Petar Grašo (Week 13 - Final)

Contestants

Color key:
 indicates the winning contestant that week
 indicates the contestant with fewest points that week
 indicates the series winner
 indicates the series runner-up

Performance chart

Color key:
 indicates the contestant came first that week
 indicates the contestant came second that week
 indicates the contestant came last that week

Week 1
Guest Judge: Saša Lozar  Aired: September 25, 2016  Winner: Hana Hegedušić

Bonus points
Matteo gave five points to Hana
Damir gave five points to Ana Maras
Fil gave five points to Filip
Filip gave five points to Fil
Žanamari gave five points to Damir
Ana Maras gave five points to Lana
Lana gave five points to Damir
Hana gave five points to Matteo

Week 2
Guest Judge: Ecija Ojdanić  Aired: October 2, 2016  Winner: Hana Hegedušić

Bonus points
Žanamari gave five points to Matteo
Filip gave five points to Lana
Hana gave five points to Damir
Ana Maras gave five points to Hana
Matteo gave five points to Fil
Lana gave five points to Hana
Damir gave five points to Hana
Fil gave five points to Damir

Week 3
Guest Judge: Maja Šuput  Aired: October 9, 2016  Winner: Ana Maras Harmander (Mario Petreković)

Jokers
Ana Maras used her joker, Mario Petreković, winner of the first season of the show, performed instead of her and won.
Bonus points
Fil gave five points to Matteo
Matteo gave five points to Žanamari
Damir gave five points to Ana Maras
Hana gave five points to Ana Maras
Filip gave five points to Žanamari
Lana gave five points to Fil
Žanamari gave five points to Ana Maras
Ana Maras gave five points to Damir

Week 4
Guest Judge: Indira Levak  Aired: October 16, 2016  Winner: Matteo Cetinski

Jokers
Hana used her joker, Maja Posavec, participant in the second season of the show, performed instead of her and finished third.
Bonus points
Filip gave five points to Matteo
Lana gave five points to Žanamari
Fil gave five points to Lana
Damir gave five points to Lana
Ana Maras gave five points to Matteo
Hana gave five points to Matteo
Matteo gave five points to Filip
Žanamari gave five points to Filip

Week 5
Guest Judge: Ivan Šarić  Aired: October 24, 2016  Winner: Ana Maras Harmander

Jokers
Damir used his joker, Mario Lipovšek Battifiaca performed instead of him and finished second.
Bonus points
Hana gave five points to Ana Maras
Matteo gave five points to Ana Maras
Filip gave five points to Ana Maras
Fil gave five points to Ana Maras
Damir gave five points to Ana Maras
Lana gave five points to Ana Maras
Žanamari gave five points to Ana Maras
Ana Maras gave five points to Filip

Week 6
Guest Judge: Danijela Martinović  Aired: October 30, 2016  Winner: Damir Kedžo

NOTES

1.  This is the first time that the performer imitates a role from opera, not one celebrity.

Jokers
Matteo used his joker, Petra Dugandžić performed instead of him.
Bonus points
Lana gave five points to Filip
Ana Maras gave five points to Damir
Damir gave five points to Hana
Hana gave five points to Damir
Žanamari gave five points to Lana
Matteo gave five points to Damir
Filip gave five points to Hana
Fil gave five points to Hana

Week 7
Guest Judge: Andrea Andrassy  Aired: November 6, 2016  Winner: Lana Jurčević

Bonus points
Damir gave five points to Lana
Žanamari gave five points to Matteo
Hana gave five points to Lana
Matteo gave five points to Lana
Fil gave five points to Matteo
Ana Maras gave five points to Lana
Filip gave five points to Lana
Lana gave five points to Matteo

Week 8
Guest Judge: Nives Ivanković  Aired: November 13, 2016  Winner: Filip Dizdar

Jokers
Lana used her joker, Igor Barberić, their dance coach, performed instead of her.
Bonus points
Matteo gave five points to Filip
Filip gave five points to Lana
Ana Maras gave five points to Filip
Hana gave five points to Filip
Fil gave five points to Žanamari
Lana gave five points to Ana Maras
Damir gave five points to Filip
Žanamari gave five points to Fil

Week 9
Guest Judge: Ivana Marić  Aired: November 20, 2016  Winner: Ana Maras Harmander

Jokers
Filip used his joker, Jan Kerekeš, Croatian actor, performed instead of him.
Bonus points
Hana gave five points to Žanamari
Ana Maras gave five points to Žanamari
Lana gave five points to Filip
Žanamari gave five points to Fil
Damir gave five points to Fil
Matteo gave five points to Fil
Fil gave five points to Filip
Filip gave five points to Ana Maras

Week 10
Guest Judge: Alka Vuica  Aired: November 27, 2016  Winner: Matteo Cetinski

Jokers
Žanamari used her joker, Minea, Croatian singer and participant of the first season, performed instead of her.
Bonus points
Fil gave five points to Matteo
Lana Maras gave five points to Ana Maras
Damir gave five points to Matteo
Ana Maras gave five points to Matteo
Filip gave five points to Lana
Žanamari Maras Maras gave five points to Damir
Hana gave five points to Matteo
Matteo gave five points to Žanamari

Week 11
Guest Judge: Ivan Zak  Aired: December 4, 2016  Winner: Filip Dizdar

Jokers
Fil used his joker, Baby Dooks, participant of the first season, performed instead of him.
Bonus points
Matteo gave five points to Filip
Žanamari gave five points to Damir
Ana Maras gave five points to Hana
Lana gave five points to Filip
Hana gave five points to Filip
Filip gave five points to Fil
Damir gave five points to Lana
Fil gave five points to Filip

Week 12
Guest Judge: Mario Petreković  Aired: December 11, 2016  Winner: Matteo Cetinski

Bonus points
Ana Maras gave five points to Damir
Fil gave five points to Matteo
Žanamari gave five points to Matteo
Damir gave five points to Matteo
Matteo gave five points to Fil
Hana gave five points to Damir
Lana gave five points to Damir
Filip gave five points to Lana

Week 13 - Final
Guest Judge: Petar Grašo  Aired: December 18, 2016  Winner: Damir Kedžo

Bonus points
Matteo gave five points to Lana
Damir gave five points to Ana Maras
Lana gave five points to Ana Maras
Ana Maras gave five points to Damir
Žanamari gave five points to Damir
Filip gave five points to Damir
Fil gave five points to Lana
Hana gave five points to Damir

See also
Tvoje lice zvuči poznato (Croatian season 1)
Tvoje lice zvuči poznato (Croatian season 2)
Tvoje lice zvuči poznato (Croatian season 4)
Tvoje lice zvuči poznato (Croatian season 5)

References

Croatia
2016 Croatian television seasons